Beckenschlägerschüssel is a term used to refer to a specific group of brass bowls that emerged in the German-speaking world in the late 15th to 16th centuries.

Artworks in metal